Martin Schlecht (born 10 November 1976) is a German cinematographer.

Life and career 
Martin Schlecht, born 1976 began his career as a camera assistant. From 2011 on he worked for movie productions and television productions as a cameraman. In 2013 he gained recognition for his work for the movie , later for the TV movie Tatort: Kalter Engel. In 2014 he worked for Til Schweiger on the film Head Full of Honey as a cameraman.

Selected filmography
 2011: The Big Black
 2012: Reality XL
 2013: 
 2013: Tatort: Kalter Engel
 2014: Head Full of Honey (Honig im Kopf)

References

External links
 Website by Martin Schlecht
 
 Martin Schlecht in: Zweitausendeins

1976 births
German cinematographers
Living people
Film people from Munich